East Bengal Club is an Indian association football club based in Kolkata, West Bengal, which competes in the Indian Super League, the top tier of Indian football. The club was formed when the vice-president of the Jorabagan Club, Suresh Chandra Chaudhuri, resigned. He did so when Jorabagan sent out their starting eleven but with the notable exclusion of defender Sailesh Bose. He was dropped from the squad for unknown reasons when they were about to face Mohun Bagan in the Coochbehar Cup Semi Final on 28 July 1920. He and Raja Manmatha Nath Chaudhuri, Ramesh Chandra Sen, and Aurobinda Ghosh, formed East Bengal, in Jorabagan, Suresh Chandra's home on 1 August 1920. East Bengal started playing in the IFA 2nd division (now the Calcutta Football League) from 1921. In 1925, they qualified for the first division for the first time. Since then, they have won numerous Indian Football titles.

East Bengal joined the National Football League at its inception in 1996 and is the only club to play every season to date, even after its name changed to the I-League in 2007. East Bengal have won the National Football League thrice: 2000–01, 2002–03 and 2003–04 and were runners up seven times, more  than any Indian football club. Among other trophies, East Bengal have won the Calcutta Football League 39 times, IFA Shield 28 times, Federation Cup eight times and the Durand Cup 16 times.

On 27 September 2020, the inclusion of East Bengal FC into the 2020–21 Indian Super League was officially announced.

Key

Indian Super League seasons
The Indian Super League (ISL) began in the year 2014 without official recognition from the Asian Football Confederation (AFC), the governing body for the sport in Asia. In 2017–18, the Indian Super League was expanded to a ten-team competition and earned recognition from the AFC. East Bengal moved from the I-League to the ISL as the eleventh team in the 2020–21 season when ISL was given the highest level league status in the Indian football system. In their inaugural season in the ISL, East Bengal finished in ninth place. In the 2021–22, East Bengal finished at the bottom of the table in the eleventh position, winning just one out of the twenty matches in the league.

National Football League/I-League seasons
The National Football League started in the year 1996 as the first football league in India to be organized on a national scale. East Bengal participated in the league from its inaugural season, and has been the only football team in India to have participated in all editions of the nation's premier league until 2020, when the Indian Super League was announced as the Premier football competition in India. The club has won the National League thrice (2000–01, 2002–03 and 2003–04) and has finished as runner-up on seven occasions. Along with the National League, the club has also won the Federation Cup, the premier cup tournament in India eight times.

Calcutta Football League seasons
East Bengal Club was included in the Calcutta Football League second division in 1921 after the Tajhat Club was disbanded and had withdrawn its name following the 1920 season. The club gained promotion to the first division for the first time in 1925 after finishing joint champions with the Cameroon's B team. The club was relegated back into the second division only once, in 1928, and regained their promotion in 1931 into the first division; the team has been in the division ever since. The club won its first Calcutta Football league title in 1942 and has won it 39 times, the most ever in the tournament's history to date. The club also holds the record for winning the most consecutive titles—eight: (2010–2017).

IFA Shield
The IFA Shield is the second oldest football tournament in India after the Durand Cup, and the fourth oldest football competition in the world. East Bengal featured in the IFA Shield for the first time in 1921 and crashed out in the second round against Dalhousie in the fourth replayed-match after three drawn matches. They won their maiden IFA Shield title in 1943, defeating Police AC 3–0 in the final. Since then, the club has won it 28 times (also once in 2018 when the tournament was played as a U-19 event), the most ever in the tournament's history.

Durand Cup
The Durand Cup is the oldest tournament in Asia. Before 1926, Indian clubs were not allowed to participate in the tournament. East Bengal participated in the tournament for the first time in 1926 and reached the third round, before losing to the eventual champions the Durham Light Infantry. The Indian clubs were again not allowed to participate until after Independence when the tournament was restarted in 1950. East Bengal won their first Durand title in 1951, defeating Rajasthan Club 2–1 in the final. The Red and Gold brigade have won the tournament 16 times, a shared record with arch-rivals Mohun Bagan for the most titles in the tournament's history.

Rovers Cup
The Rovers Cup was the third most prestigious football tournament in India, alongside the Durand Cup and the IFA Shield, forming the coveted Triple Crown of Indian football. East Bengal first participated in the tournament in 1941, reaching the Quarter-Finals in their inaugural appearance before losing to the Wales Regiment. The Red and Gold brigade first lifted the Rovers Cup in 1949 and have won it 10 times when the tournament was abolished in 2001.

Federation Cup/Super Cup
The Federation Cup, begun in 1977, was India's primary domestic cup competition until it was scrapped in 2017 and the Super Cup was launched in its place. East Bengal first participated in the tournament in 1978 and became joint champions with Mohun Bagan in their inaugural appearance. East Bengal is the second most successful club in this tournament, having won it eight times.

References

East Bengal Club related lists
East Bengal Club seasons
East Bengal
East Bengal